Kingsland is a residential neighbourhood in the southwest quadrant of Calgary, Alberta. It is bounded to the north by Glenmore Trail, to the east by Macleod Trail, to the south by Heritage Drive and to the west by Elbow Drive.

The area was annexed to the City of Calgary in 1956 and Kingsland was established in 1957. It is represented in the Calgary City Council by the Ward 11 councillor.

Demographics

Residents in this community had a median household income of $43,647 in 2000, and there were 20.1% low income residents living in the neighbourhood. As of 2000, 16.1% of the residents were immigrants. A proportion of 54.1% of the buildings were condominiums or apartments, and 63.4% of the housing was used for renting.

Education
The community is served by St. Augustine Elementary & Junior High (Catholic).

See also
List of neighbourhoods in Calgary

References

External links
Kingsland Community Association

Neighbourhoods in Calgary